"That's That" (explicitly titled "That's That Shit") is the second single by Snoop Dogg from the album Tha Blue Carpet Treatment. The song was the first single taken from the album in the United Kingdom, however the single only achieved notable success in the U.S., where it reached #20 on the Billboard Hot 100 chart. The song samples the melody played in the 1988 film Coming to America during the bathroom scene when Eddie Murphy gets washed by female servants.

Background
Snoop Dogg spoke to AllHipHop.com about the track off Tha Blue Carpet Treatment which Dr. Dre produced and features R. Kelly. Snoop explained "Dr. Dre called me today. We’ve been working on my record. He helped me fix this song I did with R. Kelly. It was a hit record before I gave it Dre, but now it’s a super hit record. He made me strike all my vocals. That means, 'Take all your lyrics off, I don’t like ‘em. They’re wack.' I even go through that shit too. To this day, you know what I mean? I ain’t too big to take criticism. He made me take all my lyrics off and me and D.O.C. had to come up with some more shit that was just extraordinary."  The title comes from Kelly repeatedly saying "That's that shit!" in the song.

The song was performed live at the MTV Europe Music Awards 2006, although Kelly wasn't present. The curiosity of the live act was that the intro of the song was the same cut as in the movie with the Victoria Dillard skit at the end, which was left unedited in the direct broadcast, though in the later reruns of the program, "penis" was censored. Though Kelly wasn't present here either, the song was also performed live at the 2006 BET Hip Hop Awards and at the 2006 American Music Awards. Kelly's part was playback in the events.

The song samples a skit from the Coming to America score, which Dr. Dre helped to mix into a single. However he worked on the original movie as well, as he provided the track "Comin' Correct" by J.J. Fad for the soundtrack. He was credited the producer.

Music video
The video premiered on MTV Tuesday, November 7 at 3:30pm EST on TRL. The album version differs from the video/single in its intro, whereas the lyrics includes the movie intro (see below), and R. Kelly answering "Thank you". The clean version has the title shortened to exclude profanity, and has R. Kelly's final solo hook its "sex" word taken out.

US 12"-vinyl track listing 
A1 That's That (Radio) (4:17)
Vocals [Featuring] - R. Kelly
A2 That's That (LP) (4:17)
Vocals [Featuring] - R. Kelly
A3 That's That (Instrumental) (4:17)

B1 Crazy (Radio) (4:31)
Vocals [Featuring] - Nate Dogg
B2 Crazy (LP) (4:32)
Vocals [Featuring] - Nate Dogg
B3 Crazy (Instrumental) (4:31)

Remixes 
A remix with Nas was presented on DubCNN where Nas changes the chorus and raps "Nas-is-back" instead of the original one. He also adds a new verse where a lady says "The royal penis is clean your highness" with Snoop responding "Thank You" in place of Kelly in the intro, which is from Coming To America. Another remix features D-Block's Sheek Louch.

Remakes 
Slim Thug & Boss Hogg Outlawz made a remake called "That Click" presented in the mixtape DJ 31 Degreez - The Forecast 3
Melanie of Redman's label Gilla House, made a remake of it on Redman's mixtape Live From The Bricks called "R&B Smoke Break".

Personnel
Written by C.Broadus, R. Kelly, D. Lamb, N. Rodgers, S. Benton, T. Curry
Produced by Nottz for DMP/Teamsta Entertainment
Additional Production by Dr. Dre
Publishers: My Own Chit Publishing/EMI Blackwood Music (BMI); Zomba Songs/R. Kelly Publishing (adm. by Zomba Songs) (BMI); DMP/Teamsta Entertainment Music (BMI); Ensign Music LLC (BMI); YEL-NATS (BMI); Almo Music Corp.(ASCAP)
Recorded by Chris Jackson at The Cathedral, Hollywood, CA
Recorded by Abel Garibaldi and Ian Mereness at The Chocolate Factory, Chicago, IL
Assisted by Jeff Meeks
Recorded by Mauricio "Veto" Iragorri at Record One Studios, Sherman Oaks, Ca
Assisted by Robert "Roomio" Reyes / Mixed by Dr.Dre at Record One Studios, Sherman Oaks, CA
Mix engineer: Mauricio "Veto" Iragorri at Record One Studios, Sherman Oaks, CA
Vocal performance used courtesy of Victoria Dillard
Contains elements from "The Bath" written by Nile Rodgers and published by Ensign Music LLC (BMI) performed by Nile Rodgers from the motion picture Coming To America courtesy of Paramount Pictures / "Coming To America" courtesy of Paramount Pictures.
Video shooting location : Chicago
Directed by Benny Boom
1st AD : Joe Osborne

B-Side 
Written by C. Broadus, F. Nassar, N. Hele
Produced by "Fredwreck" Farid Nassar for Doggy Style Productions
Publishers: My Own Chit Publishing/EMI Blackwood Music (BMI); Karam's Kid
Songs (ASCAP); Nate Dogg Music (BMI) adm. by Reach Global
Moog, Rhodes, piano, guitars, strings, & ARP by Fredwreck
Bongos by Erik Coomes
Recorded by Fredwreck at Palace De Nathan, Fred's Treehouse / Snoop's vocals recorded by Chris Jackson at The Cathedral, Hollywood, CA
Mixed by Richard "Segal" Huredia & Fredwrizzle at Paramount Recording Studios, Hollywood, CA

Charts

Weekly charts

Year-end charts

Awards and nominations

References

Media

External links 
Discogs entry
Listen to the song at his MySpace.

2006 singles
R. Kelly songs
Snoop Dogg songs
Music videos directed by Benny Boom
Songs written by R. Kelly
Songs written by Snoop Dogg
Songs written by The D.O.C.
Songs about Chicago
Dirty rap songs
Song recordings produced by Nottz